Radio New Zealand, commonly known as Radio NZ or simply RNZ, is a New Zealand public-service radio broadcaster and Crown entity that was established under the Radio New Zealand Act 1995. It operates news and current-affairs network, RNZ National, and a classical-music and jazz network, RNZ Concert, with full government funding from NZ on Air. Since 2014, the organisation's focus has been to transform RNZ from a radio broadcaster to a multimedia outlet, increasing its production of digital content in audio, video, and written forms.

The organisation plays a central role in New Zealand public broadcasting. The New Zealand Parliament fully funds its AM network, used in part for the broadcast of parliamentary proceedings. RNZ has a statutory role under the Civil Defence Emergency Management Act 2002 to act as a "lifeline utility" in emergency situations. It is also responsible for an international service (known as RNZ Pacific); this is broadcast to the South Pacific in both English and Pacific languages through its Pacific shortwave service.

History

Early years

The first radio broadcast in New Zealand was made on 17 November 1921 by radio pioneer Professor Robert Jack. Government-funded public service radio in New Zealand was historically provided by the Radio Broadcasting Company between 1925 and 1931, the New Zealand Broadcasting Board between 1931 and 1936, the National Broadcasting Service between 1936 and 1962, the New Zealand Broadcasting Corporation between 1962 and 1975, and the Radio New Zealand state-owned enterprise between 1975 and 1995. The organisation placed a strong emphasis on training its staff in Received Pronunciation, until it began promoting local and indigenous accents in the 1990s.

As part of the process of privatisation carried out by the fourth National government, the government's commercial radio operations were sold to private investors as The Radio Network in 1996 and the government's non-commercial assets (known previously as New Zealand Public Radio) became the current Radio New Zealand Crown entity.

Later years

The broadcaster is bound by the Charter and Operating Principles included in the Radio New Zealand Act, which is reviewed by the New Zealand Parliament every five years. The Radio New Zealand Amendment Act 2016 received Royal assent on 1 April 2016.

Purpose:

 As an independent public service broadcaster, the public radio company's purpose is to serve the public interest.
 Freedom of thought and expression are foundations of democratic society and the public radio company as a public service broadcaster plays an essential role in exercising these freedoms.
 The public radio company fosters a sense of national identity by contributing to tolerance and understanding, reflecting and promoting ethnic, cultural, and artistic diversity and expression.
 The public radio company provides reliable, independent, and freely accessible news and information.

RNZ broadcasts over three nationwide networks; RNZ National, RNZ Concert and the AM network which relays Parliamentary proceedings. RNZ Pacific (formerly Radio New Zealand International or RNZI) is our overseas shortwave service, broadcasting to the South Pacific and beyond, while Radio New Zealand News provides comprehensive, up-to-the-minute news and current affairs information. RNZ also allows for the archiving of broadcast material of historical interest.

It must also produce, and commission high quality programming based on research of public needs, and balance mass appeal and minority appeal programming. In achieving these objectives, it must be socially and financially responsible.

Proposed RNZ Concert closure
In February 2020, it was announced by Music Content Director Willy Macalister and Chief Executive Paul Thompson that RNZ Concert was to undergo major changes: it would be moved from the FM to the AM frequency, streamed online and the current service replaced by an automated non-stop play format. Seventeen jobs would be lost from RNZ Music, including all the Concert programme presenters. It would be replaced on FM radio with music for a younger audience as part of a new multimedia music brand.

The move was widely condemned across New Zealand, with many people seeing it as a gutting of the arts in New Zealand. Former Prime Minister Helen Clark issued a statement on Twitter saying that it "equates to a dumbing down of cultural life in NZ". Thousands of protesters issued a petition. The RNZ board reversed its decision when the government announced it would grant RNZ a third FM channel.

Merger
On 23 June 2022, Broadcasting Minister Willie Jackson introduced draft legislation to formally merge public broadcasters Radio New Zealand and TVNZ into a new non-profit autonomous Crown entity called Aotearoa New Zealand Public Media (ANZPM), commencing 1 March 2023. Under the draft legislation, RNZ would become a subsidiary of the new entity, which would be funded through a mixture of government and commercial funding. The proposed ANZPM would be headed by a board and operate under a media charter outlining goals and responsibilities including editorial independence.

On 8 February 2023, Prime Minister Chris Hipkins announced that the merger of TVNZ and RNZ into ANZPM, stating that "support for public media needs to be at a lower cost and without such significant structural change." He confirmed that both TVNZ and RNZ would receive additional government funding. Prior to the public media entity's cancellation, the two public broadcasters had spent a total of NZ$1,023,701 on the merger process; with RNZ spending  NZ$431,277 by mid-November 2022.

Radio services

RNZ National

RNZ National, formerly National Radio, is RNZ's independent news and current affairs platform and offers both its own on-air and online services and those from third party services. It includes the news and current affairs programmes Morning Report, Midday Report and Checkpoint as well as having news bulletins every hour. Its news service has specialist correspondents, overseas correspondents, reporters and a network of regional reporters. Magazine programmes include a broad range of contributors, interviews, music pieces and dramas, with reports and regular features in English and Māori. The network provides coverage of business, science, politics, philosophy, religion, rural affairs, sports and other topics.

RNZ National broadcasts in AM and FM via mono terrestrial transmitters based around New Zealand and the Optus satellite. It is also available on Sky Digital TV channel 421, Freeview satellite channel 50, and is available in stereo on the terrestrial Freeview HD service.

RNZ Concert

RNZ Concert is New Zealand's fine music network. Concert promotes New Zealand music and composition and features live broadcasts of concerts and recitals, as well as international content from other public radio broadcasters, podcasts, and on-demand programmes. RNZ Concert is an FM radio network broadcasting classical and jazz music, as well as world music, specialist programmes and regular news updates. The network was previously known as Concert FM but the name was changed as part of a wider name change within Radio New Zealand to associate Concert FM with the RNZ brand. RNZ Concert was refreshed in February 2018, with several new programmes and presenters, and a renewed focus on live music and storytelling on New Zealand's music and arts communities.

The station broadcasts in FM stereo via terrestrial transmitters located around New Zealand, as well as from the Optus satellite. It is also available on Sky Digital TV channel 422, and on Freeview's satellite and terrestrial services on channel 51. The playlist is among the most diverse and eclectic of the world's state run classical music networks.

AM Network

The AM Network is a network of radio transmitters operated by RNZ, which broadcast all sittings of the New Zealand Parliament through a contract with the Clerk of the House of Representatives. Sitting hours are seasonal, and may be extended due to certain circumstances, but are generally 14:00 to 18:00 Tuesday and Wednesday, 14:00 to 17:00 Thursday and 19:00 to 22:00 Tuesday and Wednesday. AM Network Parliamentary coverage is also streamed online, with podcasts and transcripts available.

The House is broadcast on RNZ on the House sitting days at 6:55pm and Sunday at 7:30am and 10:45pm. It looks at legislation, issues and insights from Parliament.

To help fund the operation of the station, RNZ has leased the remaining hours to Christian broadcaster Rhema Media since 1997, which uses the frequencies to broadcast the low-budget easy listening Star network. The transmitters were previously used by The Concert Programme before it moved to FM broadcasting.

RNZ Pacific

The RNZ Pacific network (also known outside New Zealand as RNZ International, or RNZI) broadcasts on shortwave and via Digital Radio Mondiale to New Zealand's neighbouring countries in the Pacific from transmitters located at Rangitaiki, near Taupō, in the North Island.
There also is a relay via WRN Broadcast and a livestream on the internet.

RNZ podcasts and series 
RNZ has a wide variety of podcasts and series. Series can be downloaded in Oggcast format.

RNZ News

RNZ's main news centres are located in Wellington and Auckland, with additional newsrooms in Whangārei, Hamilton, New Plymouth, Napier Hawkes Bay, Palmerston North, Nelson, Christchurch, and Dunedin. There is also a Parliamentary Press Gallery office situated in the Beehive in Wellington.

Before 1996, the News service provided news to all commercial stations operated by Radio New Zealand as well as many independently owned stations. New owner The Radio Network launched its own news service.

As well as on the hour news bulletins, the RNZ News service provides 24-hour programming and news and current affairs scheduled—programmes such as Morning Report with Susie Ferguson and Corin Dann, Nine to Noon with Kathryn Ryan, Midday Report with Mani Dunlop and Checkpoint with Lisa Owen.

Correspondents
 Politics – Jane Patterson / Craig McCulloch / Anneke Smith / Katie Scotcher
 Business – Gyles Beckford / Nona Pelletier / Anan Zaki / Nicholas Pointon
 Health – Rowan Quinn
 Education – John Gerritsen
 Te Manu Korihi – Mani Dunlop/Shannon Haunui-Thompson / Justine Murray
 Worldwatch – Max Towle

Regional Reporters:
 Northland – Samantha Olley
 Waikato – Andrew McRae
 Hawke's Bay – Tom Kitchin
 Taranaki/Whanganui – Robin Martin
 Manawatu – Jimmy Ellingham
 Nelson – Samantha Gee
 Otago – Timothy Brown and Tess Brunton

Websites
The RNZ website, rnz.co.nz (formerly radionz.co.nz) was launched in October 2005 and includes news coverage, programme information, online station streaming and podcasting. RNZ National, RNZ Concert, AM Network Parliament coverage, and RNZ International are available as Windows Media Audio streams. Almost all RNZ-produced programmes are available back to January 2008, and have MP3 and Ogg Vorbis and download and podcasts options. Some material is not available due to insufficient copyright clearances.

The website was awarded the Qantas Media Award for Best Website Design in 2007, a New Zealand Open Source Award in 2008, New Zealand Radio Award for Best Radio Website in 2009, and ONYA awards for Best use of HTML and CSS and Best Accessibility in 2010. The site was re-launched on 26 May 2013 with a new design and a custom CMS built using the open source Ruby On Rails framework.

The website was further redesigned and relaunched in July 2016, and the domain was moved to rnz.co.nz in May 2019.

The Wireless

In October 2013, Radio New Zealand launched the youth-focused and non-commercial website 'The Wireless'. The website emerged from the push for a youth radio station as part of Radio New Zealand's offerings. Instead of creating a youth radio station, RNZ decided to create a website or online magazine that focused on 18- to 30-year-olds which would be more relevant to the demographic.

Project manager Marcus Stickley noted that: "RNZ has had the wisdom to recognize that it didn't necessarily need to be under the RNZ brand. It needed to develop something specifically for that audience, and they've given us the freedom to go away and figure out exactly how to do that." The CEO of RNZ commented in April 2014 that The Wireless is "the most exciting innovation from RNZ in recent years."

The Wireless ceased operating as an independent publication in 2018, and was folded back into RNZ.

Tahi
Tahi, a youth-oriented platform, was launched in December 2021.

Former commercial stations
Prior to 1996, Radio New Zealand operated a large number of commercial stations around New Zealand. These stations were typically local stations with their own local identity with the origin of many stations going back to the 1930s up until more recent stations created in the 1990s. Stations in the larger centres were usually local 24 hours a day, and stations in the smaller centres featured a mixture of part-local and part-networked programming.

In 1996 the New Zealand Government sold off all of their commercial stations to a syndicate that included United States radio company Clear Channel Communications and publisher Wilson & Horton, in New Zealand the new owner became known as The Radio Network.

The following stations were previously owned by Radio New Zealand, some listed stations were closed down before the 1996 sale and Gore radio station Radio Hokonui was sold privately in 1994.

Heritage Classic Hits and Newstalk ZB stations
All of the early local radio stations started by Radio New Zealand originally broadcast on an AM frequency. FM broadcasting did not begin in New Zealand until the 1980s. In the 1980s and early 1990s, most stations listed below switched to an FM frequency but continued to broadcast on the original AM frequency. Some stations utilised the AM frequency for specialised shows such as local talkback, sports talk and local news shows. In 1993, the majority of these stations were split in two with the AM frequency used to broadcast Auckland based Newstalk ZB which was originally Auckland's 1ZB. The local station on the FM frequency adopted a common format and brand called Classic Hits with all stations retaining local programming under Radio New Zealand's operation.

 Radio Northland Whangārei
 Newstalk 1ZB Auckland (first Newstalk ZB station, adopted talk format in 1987)
 Classic Hits 97FM Auckland (first Classic Hits station and originally 1ZM)
 ZHFM Waikato
 95 BOP FM Tauranga
 Geyserland FM Rotorua
 Bay City Radio Hawkes Bay
 Radio Taranaki Taranaki
 2ZA Palmerston North
 2ZB and B90FM Wellington (2ZB became Newstalk ZB, B90FM became Classic Hits B90)
 Radio Nelson Nelson
 3ZB and B98FM Christchurch (3ZB became Newstalk ZB, B90FM became Classic Hits B98)
 Radio Caroline Timaru
 ZBFM Dunedin
 4ZA Southland

Community stations
Radio New Zealand community stations operated in the heartland areas of New Zealand, typically these stations ran limited local programming such as a local breakfast show and at other times relayed a nearby station or relayed National Radio. Following the sale to The Radio Network most of these stations became part of the Community Radio Network with programming outside the breakfast show originating from Taupō. These stations later became part of the Classic Hits network in 2001.

 Radio Forestland Tokoroa
 King Country Radio Taumarunui
 Radio Waitomo Te Kuiti
 Lakeland FM Taupō
 ZGFM Gisborne
 River City FM Whanganui
 Wairarapa FM Wairarapa
 Radio Marlborough Marlborough
 Scenicland FM West Coast
 3ZE Ashburton
 Radio Waitaki Oamaru
 4ZG Radio Hokonui Gore (sold in 1994 to independent owner)

ZM stations
Radio New Zealand operated a youth network of stations under the ZM brand with the three original stations being in Auckland, Wellington and Christchurch. The Auckland station 1ZM changed format in 1987 to Classic Hits leaving just the Wellington and Christchurch stations. Since the sale to The Radio Network ZM has been expanded to a nationwide network based in Auckland.

 93ZM Whangārei
 91ZM Wellington
 91ZM Christchurch

Sports Roundup
Sports Roundup was a network which conducted seasonal sports broadcasts in the main centres during the 1980s and 1990s, particularly used to broadcast Cricket matches in New Zealand. Following the sale to The Radio Network, Sports Roundup became known as Radio Sport, which went off the air permanently in 2020.

Other stations

 89X Auckland (purchased by Radio New Zealand in 1992, closed down 1993)
 Rock 99 Rotorua (closed down 1996)
 Classic Rock 96FM Hawkes Bay (replaced with ZM)
 Classic Rock Q91FM Palmerston North (formerly known as 2QQ, later replaced with ZM)

See also
 Radio New Zealand International

References

External links
 
 Sound Archives
 Aotearoa on the Air: 100 years of radio. Recording of Professor Jack, 17 November 1921, on RNZ.

 
Radio stations established in 1975
1975 establishments in New Zealand